Edwin Clement Rohl (July 15, 1908 – December 3, 1996) was an American farmer and politician.

Born in the town of Troy, in St. Croix County, Wisconsin, Rohl owned a farm. He served on the Pierce Valley Board of Education (similar to school board). Rohl also served in the Wisconsin State Assembly in 1959, as a Democrat. He died in River Falls, Wisconsin.

Notes

1908 births
1996 deaths
People from St. Croix County, Wisconsin
Farmers from Wisconsin
School board members in Wisconsin
20th-century American businesspeople
20th-century American politicians
Democratic Party members of the Wisconsin State Assembly